Tipperary Station is a railway station that serves the town of Tipperary, County Tipperary in Ireland. It is approximately 500 metres from centre of town.

It has a weekday passenger service of two trains to Limerick Junction and two to Waterford. There is no Sunday service. Until 19 January  2013 (inclusive) there were three trains each way. However the late-morning Waterford to Limerick Junction and early-afternoon Limerick Junction to Waterford trains are now discontinued.

Change at Limerick Junction for connections to Limerick, Cork, Tralee, Galway & Dublin.

The station is staffed, but the ticket office and platform are not wheelchair-accessible.

In the 2017 NTA Heavy Rail Census, it showed the lowest usage figures of any station in the country, with a total of ten passengers, down from 24 in the 2016 census. This figure is for a given day, not an annual figure, and does not represent any weekend-specific commuting traffic or other seasonal variations.

History
The station opened on 9 May 1848.

See also
 List of railway stations in Ireland

References

External links
 Irish Rail Tipperary Station Website
South Tipperary Rail & Bus Website

Iarnród Éireann stations in County Tipperary
Railway stations opened in 1848
Tipperary (town)
Railway stations in the Republic of Ireland opened in 1848